The Costa Rican Football  Federation (FCRF), also known as FEDEFUTBOL or FEDEFUT, is the official association football governing body in Costa Rica and is in charge of the Costa Rica national football team and the Costa Rica women's national football team.

History
On June 13, 1921, the Liga Nacional de Fútbol was created by Liga Deportiva Alajuelense, Club Sport Cartaginés, Club Sport Herediano, Club Sport La Libertad, Sociedad Gimnástica Española de San José, Club Sport La Unión de Tres Ríos and Sociedad Gimnástica Limonense to direct and organize football in Costa Rica. In 1931, the league was centralized and renamed Federación Deportiva de Costa Rica, then Federación Nacional de Fútbol and then in the 1970s to Federación Costarricense de Fútbol (FEDEFUTBOL).

Association staff

See also
 Costa Rica national football team
 Costa Rica women's national football team
 Costa Rica national under-23 football team
 Costa Rica national under-20 football team
 Costa Rica national under-17 football team
 Liga Premier Masculina de Futsal de Costa Rica

Notes
1. The UNCAF website incorrectly lists the Costa Rican Football Federation as being founded in 1931 and affiliated in 1950.

External links
Official website
 Costa Rica at FIFA website
Costa Rica at CONCACAF site

References

Costa Rica
Football in Costa Rica
Association football governing bodies in Central America
Football
Sports organizations established in 1921
1921 establishments in Costa Rica